Tongliao railway station (Chinese: 通辽站) is a railway station in Horqin District, Tongliao, Inner Mongolia, China. The station is an interchange between several conventional railways and is the terminus of the Xinmin–Tongliao high-speed railway, a branch from the Beijing–Shenyang high-speed railway.

History
In May 2016, reconstruction of the station began. First, new high-speed platforms were built. These were opened in August 2017. Subsequently, all trains began using the new platforms to allow the original station to be refurbished. This was completed in December 2017.

References

Railway stations in Inner Mongolia